Dmitri Kosmachev (born June 7, 1985) is a Russian professional ice hockey defenseman who is currently an unrestricted free agent. He most recently played with Amur Khabarovsk in the Kontinental Hockey League (KHL).

Kosmachev was raised in the HC CSKA Moscow ice hockey system and made his Super League debut at just the age of 17. The young defense man was drafted by the Columbus Blue Jackets in the third round of the 2003 National Hockey League Entry Draft with the 71st overall selection.  He has since then played for HC CSKA and HC Khimik (Mytische) in the Super League.

Career statistics

Regular season and playoffs

International

References

External links

1985 births
Admiral Vladivostok players
Ak Bars Kazan players
Amur Khabarovsk players
Atlant Moscow Oblast players
Columbus Blue Jackets draft picks
HC CSKA Moscow players
Living people
HC Neftekhimik Nizhnekamsk players
HC Ryazan players
Russian ice hockey defencemen
Torpedo Nizhny Novgorod players
Toros Neftekamsk players
Sportspeople from Nizhny Novgorod